Letispe is a monotypic moth genus in the family Geometridae described by Alexander Douglas Campbell Ferguson in 2008. Its one described species, Letispe metanemaria, described by George Duryea Hulst in 1887, is found in southwest North America in Arizona, California, Sonora and Baja California.

References

Further reading

 
 
 

Macariini
Articles created by Qbugbot
Monotypic moth genera